Saunte station is a railway station serving the village of Saunte in North Zealand, Denmark.

The station is located on the Hornbæk Line from Helsingør to Gilleleje. The train services are currently operated by the railway company Lokaltog which runs frequent local train services between Helsingør station and Gilleleje station.

External links

Lokaltog

Railway stations in the Capital Region of Denmark